Bill Scholl (born September 2, 1957) is the Director of Intercollegiate Athletics for Marquette University. Bill Scholl spent 23 years working in the University of Notre Dame athletics department before accepting a position at Ball State University as the Director of Intercollegiate Athletics. After three years at Ball State, Scholl relocated where he is now the Director of Intercollegiate Athletics at Marquette University.

Career
 Marquette University, Director of Intercollegiate Athletics, 2015–Present
 Ball State University, Director of Intercollegiate Athletics, 2012-15 
 Notre Dame, Deputy Athletics Director, 2009–12
 Notre Dame, Senior Associate Athletics Director, 2004–09
 Notre Dame, Assistant Athletics Director, 1995-04
 Notre Dame, Director of Ticketing and Marketing, 1992–95
 Notre Dame, Sports Marketing Manager, 1989–92
 Logan Center, Director of Financial Development, 1988–89
 International Summer Special Olympic Games, director of financial development, 1985–87
 Juhl Advertising Agency, public relations, 1979–85

Education
Bachelor's Degree - University of Notre Dame '79

References

External links
 Marquette profile

1957 births
Living people
Ball State Cardinals athletic directors
Marquette Golden Eagles athletic directors
University of Notre Dame alumni